A longbow is an archery weapon that uses elasticity to propel arrows.

Longbow may also refer to:

 English longbow, a particularly powerful longbow used by the medieval English and Welsh
 AH-64D Apache Longbow, an attack helicopter
 AN/APG-78 Longbow, a fire-control radar used by the Apache Longbow
 The AGM-114L Longbow Hellfire, an air-to-ground missile
 Dakota Longbow T-76, a sniper rifle
 Longbow Games, a computer game company
 Longbow (computer game), a series of combat flight simulator computer games
 Longbow bomber, a fictional spaceship from the Wing Commander series of computer games